The OFC U-19 Women's Championship (previously the OFC U-20 Women's Championship or OFC Women's Under 20 Qualifying Tournament) is a football tournament held every two years to decide the only qualification spot for the Oceania Football Confederation (OFC) representative at the FIFA U-20 Women's World Championship.

Until 2006 it was an under-19 tournament. The most recent edition for 1 to 15 July 2017 was again an U-19 tournament, and the tournament was called the OFC U-19 Women's Championship.

Results
There was no 2008 edition.

Summaries

U20 format

U19 format

Performances by countries

Participating nations
Legend

 – Champions
 – Runners-up
 – Third place
 – Fourth place
 – Semi-finals
5th–7th – Fifth to Seventh place
GS – Group stage
PR – Preliminary round
q – Qualified
 — Hosts
 ••  – Qualified but withdrew
 ×  – Did not enter
 •  – Did not qualify
 ×  – Withdrew / Banned / Entry not accepted by FIFA
 — Country not affiliated to OFC at that time
 — Country did not exist or national team was inactive
     – Not affiliated to FIFA

Notes

Women's U-20 World Cup record
Legend
 – Champions
 – Runners-up
 – Third place
 – Fourth place
QF – Quarterfinals
GS – Group stage
 — Hosts

References

External links
OFC Official Website

 
Under20
Under-20 association football